Irena Šiaulienė (born 1955) is a Lithuanian politician who is the deputy speaker of Seimas, the unicameral parliament of Lithuania.

Early life
Irena Šiaulienė was born on 19 February 1955 in Kolainiai, Kelmė District Municipality. She attended a school in Telšiai District Municipality before enrolling herself at the History department of Vilnius State University, from where she received her degree (1971–76). She did her PhD in 1987.

Career
From 1976 to 1992, Šiaulienė was an associate professor of history at the Klaipėda University. In 1990, she became a deputy-chair of the Democratic Labour Party of Lithuania. She won the 1992 Lithuanian parliamentary election to enter the Sixth Seimas and has since retained her membership and has served on various parliamentary committees. From 2000, she has been the chair of the Democratic Labour Party group in the parliament and was chosen the deputy speaker of the Seimas on 4 July 2017. She is also a member of the commission for the National Historical Memory and that for Addiction Prevention.

In 2004, Šiaulienė was awarded the Cross of Commander of the Order for Merits to Lithuania.

References

1955 births
Living people
Members of the Seimas
21st-century Lithuanian women politicians
21st-century Lithuanian politicians
Vilnius University alumni
Academic staff of Klaipėda University
Democratic Labour Party of Lithuania politicians
Social Democratic Party of Lithuania politicians
Social Democratic Labour Party of Lithuania politicians
Women members of the Seimas